Judith Earline Veronica Simpson (née Livermore; born 14 November 1960) is a British former heptathlete who competed at three Olympic Games. She went on to appear as Nightshade in the TV show Gladiators between 1993 and 1996.

Athletics career
Simpson was born in Jamaica, but brought up in Rugby, Warwickshire. She competed in the pentathlon at the 1980 Summer Olympics in Moscow and in the heptathlon and high jump at the 1984 Summer Olympics in Los Angeles. She competed in three Commonwealth Games; the 1982 Commonwealth Games in Brisbane, Queensland, Australia, the 1986 Commonwealth Games in Edinburgh, Scotland and the 1990 Commonwealth Games in Auckland, New Zealand, winning a silver, gold and bronze respectively in the heptathlon. She was also the Three A's heptathlon champion in 1982 and 1983. In 1986, Simpson won a bronze medal in the heptathlon at the European Championships in Stuttgart with a personal best points total of 6623.

Television
In 1987, Simpson participated in Prince Edward's charity television special The Grand Knockout Tournament. Between 1993 and 1996, she featured in the British television show Gladiators as "Nightshade". After appearing in an Ashes competition with Australian Gladiators, she became ill. She appeared for a few episodes of the 1996 series but was later forced to pull out.

Personal life
In 1999, Simpson's daughter, Joan Mary, died of meningitis, following a nationwide outbreak of the disease.

Achievements

References

External links

1960 births
Living people
Black British sportswomen
Jamaican female athletes
English heptathletes
English female high jumpers
English female hurdlers
Jamaican emigrants to the United Kingdom
Olympic athletes of Great Britain
Athletes (track and field) at the 1980 Summer Olympics
Athletes (track and field) at the 1984 Summer Olympics
Athletes (track and field) at the 1988 Summer Olympics
Commonwealth Games gold medallists for England
Commonwealth Games silver medallists for England
Commonwealth Games bronze medallists for England
Commonwealth Games medallists in athletics
Athletes (track and field) at the 1982 Commonwealth Games
Athletes (track and field) at the 1986 Commonwealth Games
Athletes (track and field) at the 1990 Commonwealth Games
Gladiators (1992 British TV series)
World Athletics Championships athletes for Great Britain
European Athletics Championships medalists
Universiade medalists in athletics (track and field)
Universiade bronze medalists for Great Britain
Sportspeople from Rugby, Warwickshire
Medallists at the 1982 Commonwealth Games
Medallists at the 1986 Commonwealth Games
Medallists at the 1990 Commonwealth Games